György Gedó (born 23 April 1949) is a retired Hungarian light-flyweight boxer. He competed in the 1968, 1972, 1976 and 1980 Olympics and won a gold medal in 1972. He was the European light-flyweight champion in 1969 and 1971. Gedó is Jewish.

1972 Olympic record
Below are the results of György Gedó, a Hungarian light flyweight boxer who competed at the 1972 Munich Olympics:

 Round of 32: defeated Surapong Sripirom (Thailand) by a third-round technical knockout
 Round of 16: defeated Dennis Talbot (Australia) by decision, 5-0
 Quarterfinal: defeated Volodymyr Ivanov (Soviet Union) by decision, 3-2
 Semifinal: defeated Ralph Evans (Great Britain) by decision, 5-0
 Final: defeated Kim U-gil (North Korea) by decision, 5-0 (won gold medal)

References

1949 births
Living people
Boxers at the 1968 Summer Olympics
Boxers at the 1972 Summer Olympics
Boxers at the 1976 Summer Olympics
Boxers at the 1980 Summer Olympics
Flyweight boxers
Olympic boxers of Hungary
Olympic gold medalists for Hungary
People from Újpest
Olympic medalists in boxing
Hungarian male boxers
Medalists at the 1972 Summer Olympics
Jewish Hungarian sportspeople
Jewish boxers